Nemobiinae is a subfamily of the newly constituted Trigonidiidae, one of the cricket families. The type genus is Nemobius, which includes the wood cricket, but members of this subfamily may also be known as ground crickets or "pygmy field crickets".

Characteristics
The thorax is densely bristled and the abdomen is also bristly. There are four (or sometimes three) pairs of long, movable spines above the tip of the abdomen. The ovipositor varies from being long, straight and needle-like, to short, curved and sabre-like. These crickets have wings of variable lengths and are generally brown, a suitable colour for concealment among the leaf litter and plant bases where they live. They are often active during the day and can be quite common in woodland and pastureland. They are omnivores. There are about two hundred species worldwide.

Tribes and genera
The following tribes and genera are included in subfamily Nemobiinae in the Orthoptera Species File:

Grylliscini 
Auth: Gorochov 1986; central Asia
 Grylliscus Tarbinsky, 1930

Marinemobiini 
Auth: Gorochov 1985; East Asia, Australia
 Apteronemobius Chopard, 1929
 Caconemobius Kirby, 1906
 Eumarinemobius Gorochov & Tan, 2018
 Marinemobius Gorochov, 1985
 Parapteronemobius Furukawa, 1970

Nemobiini 
(synonym: Thetellini Otte & Alexander 1983) 
Auth: Saussure 1877; South America, Europe, Africa, Asia and the Pacific
 Amonemobius Otte, 1987
 Bobilla Otte & Alexander, 1983
 Bullita Gorochov, 1986
 Dictyonemobius Chopard, 1951
 Ignambina Otte, 1987
 Ionemobius Otte, 1987
 Koghiella Otte, 1987
 Leptonemobius Sjöstedt, 1917
 Monopteropsis de Mello & Jacomini, 1994
 Nambungia Otte & Alexander, 1983
 Narellina Otte, 1994
 Nemobius Serville, 1838
 Orintia Gorochov, 1986
 Paniella Otte, 1987
 Paranemobius Saussure, 1877
 Silvinella Otte & Alexander, 1983
 Specnia Otte & Alexander, 1983
 Speonemobius Chopard, 1924
 Tahitinemobius Gorochov, 1986
 Thetella Otte & Alexander, 1983
 Tincanita Otte & Alexander, 1983

Pteronemobiini 
Auth: Vickery, 1973, worldwide distribution

 Allonemobius Hebard, 1913
 Amanayara de Mello & Jacomini, 1994
 Argizala Walker, 1869
 Dianemobius Vickery, 1973
 Eunemobius Hebard, 1913
 Kevanemobius Bolfarini & de Mello, 2012
 Neonemobius Hebard, 1913
 Phoremia Desutter-Grandcolas, 1993
 Pictonemobius Vickery & Johnstone, 1970
 Polionemobius Gorochov, 1983
 Pteronemobius Jacobson, 1904
 Stenonemobius Gorochov, 1981

Incertae sedis
 Absonemobius Desutter-Grandcolas, 1993
 †Baltonemobius Gorochov, 2010 Baltic amber, Eocene
†Birmaninemobius Xu et al., 2020 Burmese amber, Myanmar, Cenomanian
 Calperum Rentz & Su, 1996
 Cophonemobius Chopard, 1929
 Cophoscottia Chopard, 1951
 Homonemobius Chopard, 1935
 Hygronemobius Hebard, 1913
 Kanakinemobius Desutter-Grandcolas, 2016
†Liaonemobius Ren 1998 Yixian Formation, China, Aptian
 Micronemobius Ingrisch, 1987
 Ngamarlanguia Rentz & Su, 1996
 Paora Gorochov, 1986
 Pineronemobius Yong, 2018
 Scottiola Uvarov, 1940
 Sudanicus Werner, 1913
 Tahitina Hebard, 1935
 Taiwanemobius Yang & Chang, 1996
 Territirritia Rentz & Su, 1996
 Zucchiella de Mello, 1990

References

Orthoptera subfamilies
Trigonidiidae